The Free State of Prussia was one of the constituent states of Germany from 1918 to 1947. The successor to the Kingdom of Prussia after the defeat of the German Empire in World War I, it continued to be the dominant state in Germany during the Weimar Republic, as it had been during the empire, even though most of Germany's post-war territorial losses in Europe had come from its lands. It was home to the federal capital Berlin and had 62% of Germany's territory and 61% of its population. Prussia changed from the authoritarian state it had been in the past and became a parliamentary democracy under its 1920 constitution. During the Weimar period it was governed almost entirely by pro-democratic parties and proved more politically stable than the Republic itself. With only brief interruptions, the Social Democratic Party (SPD) provided the Minister President. Its Ministers of the Interior, also from the SPD, pushed republican reform of the administration and police, with the result that Prussia was considered a bulwark of democracy within the Weimar Republic.

As a result of the Prussian coup d'état instigated by Reich Chancellor Franz von Papen in 1932, the Free State was subordinated to the Reich government and deprived of its independence. Prussia had thus de facto ceased to exist before the Nazi Party seized power in 1933, even though a Prussian government under Hermann Göring continued to function formally until 1945. After the end of the Second World War, by decree of the Allied Control Council, the de jure abolition of Prussia occurred on 25 February 1947.

Establishment (1918–1920)

Revolution of 1918–1919 
On 9 November 1918, in the early days of the Revolution of 1918–1919 that brought down the German monarchy, Prince Maximilian von Baden, the last Chancellor of the German Empire – who like most of his predecessors was also Minister President of Prussia – announced the abdication of Wilhelm II as German Emperor and King of Prussia before he had in fact done so.

On the same day, Baden transferred the office of Reich Chancellor to Friedrich Ebert, the chairman of the Majority SPD (MSPD), which was the largest party in the Reichstag. Ebert then charged Paul Hirsch, the MSPD's party leader in the Prussian House of Representatives, with maintaining peace and order in Prussia. The last Minister of the Interior of the Kingdom of Prussia, Bill Drews, legitimized the transfer of de facto governmental power to Hirsch. On 10 November Ebert found himself forced to form a joint government, the Council of the People's Deputies, with representatives of the Independent SPD (USPD), a more leftist and anti-war group that had broken away from the original united SPD in 1917, and to enter into an alliance with the council movement, a form of council communism.

On 12 November 1918 commissioners from the Workers' and Soldiers' Councils of Greater Berlin, including Paul Hirsch, Otto Braun (MSPD) and Adolph Hoffmann (USPD), appeared before the last Deputy Minister President of Prussia, Robert Friedberg. They declared the previous government deposed and claimed the management of state affairs for themselves. On the same day the commissioners issued instructions that all departments of the state should continue their work as usual. A manifesto, "To the Prussian People!", stated that the goal was to transform "the old, fundamentally reactionary Prussia ... into a fully democratic component of the unified People's Republic."

Revolutionary cabinet 

On 13 November the new government confiscated the royal property and placed it under the Ministry of Finance. The following day, the Majority and Independent Social Democrats formed the Prussian revolutionary cabinet along the lines of the coalition at the Reich level. It included Paul Hirsch, Eugen Ernst and Otto Braun of the MSPD and Heinrich Ströbel, Adolph Hoffmann and Kurt Rosenfeld of the USPD. Almost all departments were under ministers from both parties. Hirsch and Ströbel became joint chairmen of the cabinet. Other non-partisan ministers or ministers belonging to different political camps were also included, such as the Minister of War, initially Heinrich Schëuch, then from January 1919 Walther Reinhardt. The narrower, decisive political cabinet, however, included only politicians from the two workers' parties. Since the leadership qualities of the two chairmen were comparatively weak, it was mainly Otto Braun and Adolph Hoffmann who set the tone in the provisional government.

Political change and its limits 
On 14 November the Prussian House of Lords was abolished and the House of Representatives dissolved. The replacement of political elites, however, remained limited during the early years. In many cases the former royal district administrators continued to hold office as if there had been no revolution. Complaints against them by the workers' councils were either dismissed or ignored by Interior Minister Wolfgang Heine (MSPD). When conservative district administrators themselves requested to be dismissed, they were asked to stay on in order to maintain peace and order.

On 23 December the government issued an administrative order for the election of a constitutional assembly. Universal, free and secret suffrage for both women and men replaced the old Prussian three-class franchise. At the municipal level, however, it took eight months before the existing governmental bodies were replaced by democratically legitimized ones. Deliberations concerning a fundamental reform of property relations in the countryside, in particular the breaking up of large landholdings, did not bear fruit. The manor districts that were the political power base of the large landowners remained in place.

In educational policy, Minister of Culture Adolph Hoffmann abolished religious instruction as a first step in a push towards the separation of church and state. The move triggered considerable unrest in Catholic areas of Prussia and revived memories of Bismarck's 1870s Kulturkampf ('cultural conflict') against the Catholic Church. At the end of December 1919, MSPD Minister Konrad Haenisch rescinded Hoffmann's decree. In a letter to the Cardinal of Cologne Felix von Hartmann, Minister President Hirsch assured him that Hoffmann's provisions for ending clerical supervision of schools had been illegal because they had not been voted on in the cabinet. More strongly than any other government measures, Hoffmann's socialist cultural policies turned large segments of the population against the revolution.

The Christmas riots in Berlin between the People's Navy Division and units of the German army led to the withdrawal of the USPD from the government in both Prussia and at the Reich level. The dismissal of Emil Eichhorn (USPD) as Berlin's police chief triggered the failed Spartacist Uprising of 5–12 January 1919 that attempted to turn the direction of the revolution towards the founding a communist state.

Separatist tendencies and the threat of dissolution 
Prussia's continued existence was by no means assured in the aftermath of the revolution. In the Rhine Province, the advisory council of the Catholic Centre Party, fearing a dictatorship of the proletariat, called on 4 December 1918 for the formation of a Rhineland-Westphalian republic independent of Prussia. In the Province of Hanover, 100,000 people signed an appeal for territorial autonomy. In Silesia too there were efforts to form an independent state. In the eastern provinces, a revolt broke out at Christmas 1918 with the aim of restoring a Polish state. The movement soon encompassed the entire Province of Posen and eventually took on the character of a guerrilla war.

Even for many supporters of the Republic, Prussian dominance seemed a dangerous burden for the Reich. Hugo Preuß, author of the draft version of the Weimar Constitution, originally envisaged breaking Prussia into various smaller states. Given Prussian dominance in the former empire, there was sympathy for the idea. Otto Landsberg (MSPD) of the Council of the People's Deputies commented, "Prussia occupied its position with the sword and that sword is broken. If Germany is to live, Prussia in its present form must die."

The new socialist government of Prussia was opposed to such a move. On 23 January 1919 participants in an emergency meeting of the central council and the provisional government spoke out against Prussia's dissolution. With the Centre Party abstaining, the State Assembly during its first sessions adopted a resolution against a possible breakup of Prussia. Aside from a few exceptions, which included Friedrich Ebert, there was little support for it even among the Council of the People's Deputies at the Reich level because it was seen as the first step toward the secession of the Rhineland from the Reich.

The mood in Prussia was more uncertain. In December 1919 the State Assembly passed a resolution by 210 votes to 32 that stated: "As the largest of the German states, Prussia views its first duty to be an attempt to see whether the creation of a unified German state cannot be achieved."

State Assembly and coalition government 

On 26 January 1919, one week after the 1919 German federal election, elections were held for the constituent Prussian State Assembly. During the campaign, reaching out to female voters, who were going to the polls for the first time, played an important role. In Catholic regions of the state, Hoffmann's anti-clerical school program helped the Centre Party to mobilize its voter base. The MSPD emerged as the strongest party, followed by the Centre and the German Democratic Party (DDP). The Assembly met for the first time on 13 March 1919, during the final days of the violent Berlin March battles and the Ruhr uprising.

On 20 March the Assembly passed a law for the provisional ordering of the state's powers. It transferred all previous rights of the Prussian king, including his role as the highest authority of the Protestant church, to the Ministry of State, with the exception of his right to adjourn or close the State Assembly. The Ministry of State was appointed by the President of the State Assembly, had a collegial structure, and depended on the confidence of a majority in Parliament. In order to provide legal certainty, all previous laws that did not contradict the provisions of the provisional order remained in force.

The most important task of the Assembly was to draft a constitution. The constitutional committee included eleven members from the MSPD, six from the Centre, four each from the DDP and the right-wing nationalist German National People's Party (DNVP), and one each from the USPD and the liberal German People's Party (DVP). (See the Constitution section below for additional details.)

On 25 March 1919 the provisional revolutionary Hirsch government resigned. It was replaced, as in the Reich, by a coalition of MSPD, Centre and DDP, the so-called Weimar Coalition, which together held 298 of 401 seats. Paul Hirsch became Minister President. His cabinet included four members from the MSPD, two from the Centre, and two from the DDP. Most of the ministries had existed under the monarchy, although the Ministry of Public Welfare was new. Along with the Ministry of the Interior, it developed into one of the largest ministries because of the range of its tasks.

Unrest and the Kapp Putsch 
Widespread strikes, especially in the mining industry of the Ruhr, began in January 1919. They led to shortages in energy supplies across Germany, and particularly in Prussia caused transportation problems as well. In early April Reichswehr troops marched into the Ruhr and bloodily put down the uprising. In August 1919 armed uprisings took place in Upper Silesia among segments of the Polish population (first Silesian uprising). The violence there was suppressed by military means as well. In Pomerania clashes broke out between agricultural workers and large landowners, who received support from regional army and Freikorps units. Agriculture Minister Otto Braun pushed through an emergency decree in September to enforce collectively agreed on regulations regarding farm workers' wages.

In March 1920 the republican order in the Reich and in Prussia was challenged by the Kapp Putsch, a right-wing attempt to overthrow the Reich government. It was part of specifically Prussian history in that the only relatively united social group behind the putsch was the state's large landowners. They were joined by some military officers and members of the educated civil service. Overall, the putsch was a rebellion of conservative East Elbia, the largely rural area east of the Elbe River, that feared loss of its traditional power. While the Reich government fled to Stuttgart, the Prussian government remained in Berlin. A general strike against the putsch, initiated in particular by unions and civil servants, largely paralyzed public life in Prussia. Most of the governors of the Prussian provinces stood behind the legal state government. Only those of the provinces of Schleswig-Holstein, Hanover and East Prussia supported the putsch. It is noteworthy that August Winnig, the governor of East Prussia, was a Social Democrat. The situation was different with many district administrators. There was a clear east–west divide among them. In the western provinces almost all of the district administrators stood by the constitutional government, even if in some cases only under pressure from the workers. In East Prussia all of them sided with the anti-republicans. The putsch attempt collapsed after six days.

The Kapp Putsch and ensuing general strike led to a profound break that all but turned Prussia into a model republican state. Otto Braun replaced Hirsch as Minister President. Carl Severing became the new Minister of the Interior. Both were much more assertive than their predecessors in office. Hirsch and Finance Minister Südekum were also politically discredited because they had negotiated with the putschists. The "Braun-Severing system" became synonymous with democratic Prussia.

Structure

Territory 

Most of the German territorial cessions stipulated in the Treaty of Versailles affected Prussia. Eupen-Malmedy went to Belgium, Danzig became a free city under the administration of the League of Nations, and the Memel Territory came under Allied administration before ultimately going to Lithuania. The Hultschiner Ländchen went to Czechoslovakia, large areas of the provinces of Posen and West Prussia became part of the new state of Poland, and East Prussia was separated from the rest of Reich territory by the Polish Corridor. Additional changes were decided by plebiscites. In Northern Schleswig 74% of the vote on 10 February 1920 was in favor of annexation to Denmark, to which it was subsequently ceded. In the southern part, 81% of voters chose on 14 March to remain in Germany. The new German-Danish border was established on 26 May. Eastern Upper Silesia went to Poland, although the majority of voters in the plebiscite there had voted to remain in the German Reich. Over 90% of those who voted in the plebiscite in southern East Prussia and parts of West Prussia were in favor of remaining part of Germany. The Saar region was placed under the control of the League of Nations for fifteen years before a referendum was to be held there. The former Imperial Territory of Alsace–Lorraine, which had been effectively under Prussian administration, was ceded to France without a vote.

The annexation of the Free State of Waldeck-Pyrmont was the one Prussian territorial addition during the Weimar Republic. The Pyrmont district made the first step after a referendum in 1921. The rest of the state followed in 1929.

The loss of territory had considerable negative economic and financial consequences for the Prussian state, including the costs of repatriation and provision for state employees. Under the Ministry of Justice alone, 3,500 civil servants and employees were affected.

Population 
After 1918 the population did not increase as rapidly as it had before the war. In addition to the continuation of the demographic transition of modern industrial societies to lower birth rates, the losses of the First World War were also a factor. The large population movements within Prussia slowed. In contrast to the period before 1914, more people were moving into Prussia from foreign countries than were emigrating. In-migration from ceded territories along with increasing immigration, especially from eastern Europe, both played a role.

There were also major differences in population density across Prussia. In 1925 East Prussia had an average of 60.9 inhabitants per square kilometer, while the Rhine Province had 295.6. Because of the extent of its low population rural regions, Prussia had a density of 130.7 per square kilometer, which was below average among the German states. The Free State of Saxony, by way of contrast, had 333 inhabitants per km2.

Settlement patterns and urban growth 
Urbanization and urban growth lost momentum compared to the pre-1914 period. Population increases in larger cities were caused not so much by in-migration as by incorporation. This was the case with the formation of Greater Berlin in 1920, when 7 cities, 56 rural communities and 29 estate districts were incorporated. Even more extensive and consequential for the formation of large cities were the municipal reforms in the Ruhr region at the end of the 1920s.

There were still considerable geographical differences in the extent of urbanization. While in East Prussia more than 60% of the inhabitants lived in village communities in 1925, in the Province of Westphalia the figure was just 16.5%. In East Prussia 12.4% of the population lived in cities with more than 100,000 inhabitants; in the Rhine Province it was over 41%.

Economy 

Industry and the skilled trades dominated Prussia's economy in 1925, accounting for 41.3% of all workers. Agriculture played only a secondary role at 22%, with trade and transport trailing only slightly at 17.5%. The other economic sectors lagged well behind. There were strong geographic differences in Prussia's economic structure as well. In East Prussia agriculture employed 45.4% of the workforce, while industry and skilled crafts accounted for only 19.6%. The Hohenzollern Lands, where 53.7% of the population lived from the land, was the most heavily agricultural region. By contrast, agriculture was of very little importance in the Rhineland and Westphalia, each with about 13%. The commercial sector was correspondingly strong, at over 56% in Westphalia. Berlin's commercial sector at 46% was high, but the city's metropolitan character was reflected above all in the share of the trade and transport sector, which was over 28%. Overall there were still considerable economic differences after 1918 between the eastern part of the Free State which tended to be agrarian and the industrial west.

Social structure 
In 1925 almost half of the population was employed. Of these, 46.8% were blue collar workers, 17.1% were salaried employees and civil servants, 16.2% were self-employed, 15.4% were contributing family members (those who work in a business managed by a self-employed member of their family such as an independent farmer or shop owner and who receive at most pocket money instead of a salary), and 4.5% were domestic workers. The unemployment rate in 1925 was 6%. The proportions varied depending on the predominant economic sector of the individual provinces. In more rural East Prussia, the number of contributing family members was significantly higher at 22.3% than in industrial Westphalia, where it was 12.8%. Conversely, the proportion of blue-collar workers in East Prussia was 42.6%, while in Westphalia it was 54.1%. In metropolitan Berlin, the proportion of blue-collar workers at 45.9% was lower than in Westphalia despite Berlin's important industrial sector. The reason was the strength of the city's tertiary sector. Salaried employees and civil servants accounted for 30.5% in Berlin, whereas in Westphalia it was 15.6%.

Berlin's special urban situation was also reflected in its average income. At 1,566 Reichsmarks in 1928, the average income in Berlin-Brandenburg was more than 30% higher than the Reich average. In agrarian East Prussia, average earnings were only 814 Reichsmarks, more than 30% below the Reich average. Industrial areas such as Westphalia and the Rhineland were roughly in line with the German average.

Despite the efforts of the Prussian government in areas such as education, upward mobility remained limited. In 1927/28, only one percent of junior lawyers came from working-class families. Advancement opportunities were significantly better from primary schools. The proportion of students from working-class families at educational academies rose from 7 percent in 1928/29 to 10 percent in 1932/33.

State and administration

Administrative divisions 

The Free State consisted of twelve provinces plus Berlin, whose status corresponded to that of a province. The Hohenzollern Lands in southern Germany were a unique type of administrative district that was not a true province but that had almost all the rights of one. The provinces were headed by governors appointed by the Ministry of State. There was in addition a provincial council consisting of the governor, a member appointed by the Minister of the Interior and five members elected by the provincial committee. The provinces each had a parliament. In Hesse-Nassau, municipal parliaments existed for the district associations alongside the provincial parliament. The provincial parliaments elected a  who headed the governmental administration; the corresponding office in Berlin was the mayor. In addition, the provincial parliament elected a provincial committee from its own ranks to manage day-to-day business. The provincial parliaments sent representatives to the national-level Reichsrat and the corresponding Prussian Council of State.

Below the provincial level there were (as of 1933) 34 administrative districts; some provinces, including Posen-West Prussia, Upper Silesia, Schleswig-Holstein and also Berlin, had just a single administrative district. A total of 361 districts (called  or ) formed the basis of state administration in rural areas and small towns. Larger cities generally formed urban districts, of which there were a total of 116. While there were only five urban districts in agrarian East Prussia, there were 21 in industrial Westphalia.

Constitution 
See also:  (Full text in English)

Carl Severing did not submit a draft constitution until 26 April 1920 because of delays caused by the Kapp Putsch and the wait for the Reich constitution, which was ratified on 11 August 1919. On 30 November 1920 the State Assembly adopted the constitution of the Free State of Prussia. 280 deputies voted in favor, 60 against and 7 abstained. The DNVP and independent deputies in particular voted against it.

In contrast to the Reich and other states in the Weimar Republic, there was no state president. The lack of an institution above the governing ministers and the parliamentary majority clearly distinguished Prussia from the Reich. Overall, the position of Parliament under the constitution was strong. A distinctive feature was the Minister President's position, which was elevated by his authority to make policy. Minister President Otto Braun in particular clearly recognized this and made purposeful use it.

The constitution also provided for elements of plebiscitary democracy in the form of referendums and petitions.

Parliament 
The legislative period of the Parliament was four years. It could be dissolved by majority vote or referendum. Parliament acted as the legislature, elected the Minister President, had the right to establish committees of inquiry, and could amend the constitution by a majority of two-thirds of the deputies. It also had the right to censure individual ministers or the Ministry of State as a whole. With a two-thirds majority, it could impeach ministers before the state court.

Ministry of State 
The Ministry of State was the highest and leading authority in the state; it consisted of the Minister President and the ministers of state (Article 7). Although it was organized collegially, the Minister President had policy-making authority (Article 46). He was elected by Parliament. After an amendment to the rules of procedure, an absolute majority was required from 1932 onward. The Minister President appointed the other ministers (Article 45).

The constitution did not specify the ministries; they came about from practical requirements. Following the transfer of military responsibilities to the Reich, there was no Prussian Minister of War after 1919. The Minister of Public Works also lost his most important area of responsibility with the establishment of the German National Railway, and the ministry was dissolved in 1921. The office of Minister of Welfare, which had existed in the provisional government, was formally created. There were also ministries of the interior, finance, justice, agriculture and trade. The Ministry of Spiritual, Educational and Medical Affairs was renamed the Ministry of Science, Art and National Education in 1918. The economic interests of the state were largely concentrated in the Ministry of Trade and Commerce. It was the second most powerful state ministry after the Ministry of the Interior and was able to have a considerable impact on domestic and foreign trade beyond Prussia's borders.

After the 1932 Prussian coup d'état, which replaced Prussia's legal government by Franz von Papen as Reich Commissioner, the Ministry of Welfare in its old form was dissolved. At the same time, the Minister of Trade also became the Minister of Economics and Labor. The Ministry of Justice was dissolved in 1935 under the law transferring the administration of justice to the Reich.

Council of State 
The constitution stipulated the formation of a Council of State to represent the provinces of Prussia. Its members were elected by the provincial parliaments; they could not be parliamentary members at the same time. The government was to inform the body about affairs of state. The Council of State could express its views, had the right to initiate legislation and could lodge an objection to laws passed by Parliament. With a two-thirds majority, Parliament could, with a few exceptions, reject the objection or call for a referendum. Until 1933 the mayor of Cologne and future Chancellor of the Federal Republic of Germany, Konrad Adenauer, was chairman of the Council of State.

Relationship to the Reich 
The Weimar Constitution and the new Prussian Constitution permanently changed the relationship between the Reich and Prussia. Unlike during the empire, the executive branch at the Reich level was completely independent of Prussia's. The same person was no longer both Reich Chancellor and Prussian Minister President. The great importance of state taxes declined in favor of a central tax administration. The Reich had fiscal sovereignty and distributed revenues to the states. Along with the military and railroads, waterways and a large part of social administration became the responsibility of the Reich.

Although 61% of the Reich's population lived in Prussia in 1925, it had only two-fifths of the votes in the Reichsrat, the Reich-level equivalent of the Council of State. In a departure from the empire's Federal Council, and in contrast to the other states, only half of the members of the Reichsrat to which Prussia was entitled were appointed by the Prussian government. The remaining members were elected by the provincial parliaments.

State-owned enterprises 
Between 1921 and 1925 the administration of state-owned enterprises was moved away from the direct responsibility of the Ministry of Trade and Industry on the initiative of the department's minister, Wilhelm Siering (SPD). Joint stock companies were formed to manage the state-owned mines, salt works, smelters, water works, and electrical generation plants. Ideas about the economic common good, such as those advocated by State Secretary Hans Staudinger (SPD), also played a role in the expedited development of state-owned companies.

Political system

Party system 
The Prussian party system – made up of conservatism (German National People's Party, DNVP), political Catholicism (Centre Party), liberalism (German People's Party, DVP, and German Democratic Party, DDP), social democracy (Majority Social Democratic Party, MSPD) and socialism/communism (Independent Social Democratic Party, USPD, and Communist Party of Germany, KPD) – corresponded to that at the Reich level. The DNVP had a special affinity to the former Prussian monarchy. Among the regional parties, the German-Hanoverian Party (DHP) had some influence. The MSPD and USPD, which had split in 1917, merged in 1922 and resumed the original SPD name. (A small and politically insignificant part of the USPD continued to exist until 1931 when it merged with the Socialist Worker's Party of Germany.)

The DNVP and DVP had strongholds in a few cities and in areas that were more rural and Protestant, especially east of the Elbe River. In East Prussia the DNVP received over 30% of the vote in the 1928 federal election for the Reichstag. The Centre was strong in Catholic areas such as Silesia, the Rhineland and Westphalia. The left-wing parties were important in large cities and heavily commercial non-Catholic areas. In Berlin, for example, the SPD's vote came to 34% in 1928 and the KPD's to almost 30%. The rise of the Nazi Party (NSDAP) changed the pattern, but it remained dominant in basic terms until 1932.

Within Prussia there were considerable differences in support for the Republic. The majority in Berlin, the Rhineland and Westphalia were in favor of a democracy, while reservations remained in the eastern and agrarian provinces. In the March 1933 Reichstag elections, the NSDAP had above-average strength in constituencies such as East Prussia (56.5%), Frankfurt an der Oder (55.2%), Liegnitz (54%) and Schleswig-Holstein (53.2%), but was significantly weaker in Berlin (31.3%), Westphalia (34.3%) and the Rhineland (34.1%) than the Reich average (43.9%).

A factor in Prussia's political stability was that the SPD, which was the strongest party during most of the Weimar Republic, was prepared until 1932 to assume government responsibility and not withdraw into an opposition role as it had at the Reich level in 1920, 1923 and 1930. Leaders in the Prussian SPD quickly identified with their new task. The philosopher Eduard Spranger spoke of an "affinity of Social Democracy for the Prussian", and Otto Braun claimed that "Prussia has never been governed in a more Prussian manner than during my term of office." In addition to the party's leading individuals, structural reasons also played a role in the SPD's strength. The political break from the three-class franchise to a democratic constitution was more pronounced in Prussia than in other states of the Reich that had had similar voting systems. Unlike in the Reichstag, which had many long-standing SPD parliamentarians who were accustomed to the role of opposition, there were hardly any such in the Prussian Parliament. The parliamentary party members were therefore not as influenced by entrenched roles and were better able to adapt to being a party that formed part of the government. In addition, the left wing of the party, which was critical of cooperation with the bourgeois parties, was weak. Compromise solutions were therefore easier to implement in Prussia than in the Reich.

Despite their strength, especially in the large cities, only a few mayors in the major cities were Social Democrats. The party had respect for the expertise of bourgeois municipal politicians and often left this position to representatives of the DDP. Only Ernst Reuter in Magdeburg and Max Brauer in Altona were among the Social Democratic mayors in early 1933.

Democratization of the state administration 
During the revolution, Prussian civil servants declared that their loyalty was not to the monarchy but to the Prussian state. Initially, the government, and in particular the Minister of the Interior Wolfgang Heine (SPD), largely refrained from reorganizing the state administration in the spirit of the Republic. Heine made a crucial mistake when he appointed Magnus Freiherr von Braun (DNVP) – father of rocket scientist Wernher von Braun and later one of the supporters of the Kapp Putsch – as a personnel officer. By the end of 1919, only 46 Social Democrats had been appointed to higher administrative posts. Of some 480 district administrators, only 24 belonged to the SPD. The Kapp Putsch showed the weakly developed loyalty of some of the senior civil servants, many of whom were close to the DNVP, which was hostile to the Republic.

The new Minister of the Interior, Carl Severing, carried out a fundamental reform after the March 1920 Kapp Putsch. Senior civil servants hostile to the Republic were dismissed, and the political reliability of new hires was checked. A total of about one hundred senior civil servants were placed on retirement. Among these were three governors, three district presidents and 88 district administrators. Almost all of these were from the eastern provinces. In addition to supporters of the conservative parties, they included the Social Democratic governors August Winnig (East Prussia) and Felix Philipp (Lower Silesia).

Severing and his successors purposefully appointed supporters of the coalition parties as political officials. The policy led to a considerable change in the heads of departments. In 1929, 291 of 540 political officials were members of Weimar Coalition parties, including nine of 11 governors and 21 of 32 district presidents. The shift also changed the social composition among top officials. While in 1918 eleven governors were aristocrats, only two were in the period between 1920 and 1932. There were nevertheless still lagging regions. While in the western provinces 78% of newly appointed district administrators were supporters of the governing parties, the situation in the eastern provinces was noticeably different as late as 1926. There supporters of the coalition made up only one-third of district administrators; the rest were mostly conservative nonpartisans.

Another limitation was that a breakup of the monopoly of lawyers in the higher civil service posts did not succeed. Only in exceptional cases, such as that of Wilhelm Richter, Berlin's police chief, were outsiders appointed.

Republicanization of the police 
The Prussian police force was not only the strongest in the Reich but also the most important instrument of the Prussian government's executive branch for maintaining constitutional order. Massive restructuring also began in the police force after the Kapp Putsch in order to ensure its loyalty to the Republic. Under the leadership of the Minister of the Interior, the republican-minded police chief Wilhelm Abegg became the decisive figure in carrying out the reform. By the end of the 1920s, all leading police officers were republicans. Of thirty police chiefs in 1928, fifteen were members of the SPD, five belonged to the Centre, four to the DDP, three to the DVP, and the rest were nonpartisan.

Below the command level, however, the situation was somewhat different. A large proportion of the police were former professional soldiers; the majority were conservative and anti-communist, and some maintained relations with right-wing organizations. For them the enemy was on the left.

An important change in the organization was the creation of the Protection Police (Schutzpolizei) as an instrument to protect the constitution and the Republic.

Justice 

In the judiciary, reforms remained limited even longer than they did in the police force. Many judges continued to support the monarchy. In political trials, left-wing defendants were regularly judged more harshly than those on the right. One reason in particular for the hesitant intervention of democrats and centrists was respect for the independence of the judiciary. The autonomy of judges had been explicitly enshrined in the constitution. It made a fundamental republicanization of the judiciary impossible. Moreover, the Minister of Justice Hugo am Zehnhoff, who held the office from 1919 to 1927, had no real interest in judicial reform. The authorities did, however, pay attention to the attitude towards democracy among new appointees. But the Free State did not survive long enough for it to have a noticeable effect. One estimate in 1932 suggested that only about 5% of judges were republican-minded.

Weimar Republic (1921–1933)

Grand coalition (1921–1925)

Formation 

After the adoption of the constitution, elections for the first regular state Parliament were set for 20 February 1921. The MSPD emerged as the strongest political force with 114 seats, followed by the Centre with 81. Even though the German Democratic Party (DDP) lost seats to the German People's Party (DVP), the Weimar coalition (SPD, DDP, and Centre) with a combined 224 of 428 seats still had a majority, albeit a small one, unlike in the 1920 Reichstag election, following which a minority government of the Centre, DDP and DVP was built.

 
Forming a new government in Prussia did not prove to be easy. While the DDP and the Centre wanted to bring the DVP into the coalition, the MSPD rejected the proposal because of the DVP's closeness to heavy industry and its unclear attitude towards the Republic. As a result, Otto Braun did not run as a candidate for Minister President. Instead, Adam Stegerwald of the Centre Party was elected with the votes of the previous coalition and the DVP, but his attempt to form a solid grand coalition failed. The MSPD then terminated its support, and Stegerwald resigned.

In a second election on 21 April, Stegerwald was re-elected with the votes of the bourgeois parties including the DNVP. He formed a minority government consisting of the Centre and the DDP as well as some independents. They had to seek support from the MSPD and DNVP on a case-by-case basis.

Pressure on Prussian policy came primarily from external factors. After the London ultimatum of 5 May 1921 regarding German payment of war reparations, Allied troops occupied Düsseldorf and Duisburg in the Ruhr. The assassination of former Reich Vice-Chancellor and Finance Minister Matthias Erzberger on 26 August by members of the far right Organisation Consul shocked supporters of the Republic. In September 1921 the MSPD cleared the way for a coalition with the DVP at its party congress in Görlitz. Otto Braun stated:What we are dealing with here is the conversion of our party from an acting to a governing party. This is very difficult for many because it takes us from a comfortable position to one that is sometimes very uncomfortable and full of responsibility. ... The comrades who speak against the resolution do not have sufficient confidence in the power of our party's appeal. We must have the will to power.After the MSPD withdrew support from the government in October 1921, accusing the Ministry of State of leaning towards the DNVP, negotiations began to form a grand coalition. On 5 November 1921, the MSPD and DVP joined the cabinet, and Stegerwald resigned.
The opposition within the MSPD parliamentary group was considerable. Forty-six deputies voted for and 41 against the formation of a grand coalition. There were also significant reservations within the DVP. In the end, 197 of 339 deputies present voted for Braun as Minister President. Ministers were chosen from the MSPD, Centre, DDP and DVP. Carl Severing again became Minister of the Interior.

Prussia's grand coalition proved to be a stabilizing factor in the Weimar Republic and contributed to its ability to survive the crisis year of 1923. The DVP remained loyal to the coalition even though it was courted by the DNVP to form a "citizens' bloc". An effectively functioning coalition committee successfully ensured that the different political interests were balanced, but despite the collegial cooperation, Braun and Severing dominated the government.

The coalition lay claim to nothing less than a "Prussian democratic mission" for all of Germany. This was especially true after the murder of Reich Foreign Minister Walther Rathenau (DDP) on 24 June 1922, once again by members of the Organisation Consul. On the basis of the Reich "Law for the Protection of the Republic", which was strongly supported by the Prussian government, Interior Minister Severing banned the Nazi Party in Prussia on 15 November 1922.

Crisis year 1923 
Prussian territory was directly affected when troops from France and Belgium occupied the Ruhr on 11 January 1923 after Germany defaulted on its war reparations payments, although the main decisions on how to react were made at the Reich level. Immediately before the occupation, the Prussian Parliament – with the exception of the Communist Party – protested against the actions of the French and Belgians. At the same time, the population of the Rhineland and Westphalia was called on to exercise prudence. The Prussian government ultimately supported the passive resistance called for by the Reich. Prussian officials were instructed not to obey the orders of the occupiers. It quickly became apparent, however, that the economic burden caused by the situation was becoming enormous. The trend toward inflation that had existed since World War I exploded into the hyperinflation of the Weimar Republic.

Domestically, the crisis strengthened radical forces. After a number of violent acts by right-wing militants, Interior Minister Severing banned the German Völkisch Freedom Party (DVFP), despite the reservations of the Reich government. Nationalists sharply attacked Severing in public and in the state Parliament, but overall Parliament backed him by a large majority.

Ending the struggle against the occupation of the Ruhr (which occurred on 26 September 1923) was necessary before currency reform could be carried out in the Reich. The still occupied Rhineland, however, was excluded from the introduction of the new Rentenmark on 16 November 1923. This spurred the regional separatists to action. A Rhenish Republic was proclaimed in various cities, but it met with little response from the population. By the end of the year, secession of the Rhineland and Westphalia had failed. The major political crises of 1923, such as Adolf Hitler's Beer Hall Putsch in Bavaria and the attempt at a communist revolution, the so-called "German October" in central Germany, took place outside Prussia. Reich Chancellor Gustav Stresemann (DVP) described the Prussia of the 1923 crisis period as the "bulwark of German republicans".

Transitional cabinet of Wilhelm Marx 
At the beginning of 1924 there were increasing signs that the grand coalition's common ground had been lost. On 5 January the DVP demanded that the DNVP be brought into the government and that Braun resign. When he refused, the DVP withdrew its ministers from the government and brought an end to the coalition. Forming a new government proved as difficult as it had been in 1920. On 10 February the former Reich Chancellor Wilhelm Marx (Centre), supported by the Centre, DDP and SPD, was elected Minister President. He formed a cabinet consisting of the Centre and DDP, keeping Severing as Minister of the Interior. After losing a vote of confidence, Marx resigned but remained in office until April in an acting capacity.

New state parliamentary elections were held on 7 December 1924.

High point of political stability 

Otto Braun was elected Minister President on 3 April 1925, with 216 of 430 votes. Like Marx, his base was SPD, Centre and DDP. Braun took over the majority of Marx's cabinet and looked to continuity in policy. He blamed the months-long government crisis on what he called the "German national communist bloc", by which he meant all the opposition parties from the DVP and DNVP to the various small parties, which included the NSDAP and the Communists. Braun said that "they are as incapable of building as they are unanimous in destroying." The new cabinet was a minority government, but it proved remarkably stable.

Settlement with the Hohenzollerns 
The question of financial settlements with Germany's former ruling dynasties was in principle a matter for the states. In Prussia negotiations with the Hohenzollerns failed in 1920 because the SPD rejected the proposal in the state Parliament, and the former royal house objected to it in 1924. In 1925 the Ministry of Finance under Hermann Höpker-Aschoff (DDP) submitted another draft proposal. It was extraordinarily favorable to the Hohenzollerns and led to fierce criticism from the SPD and DDP. The DDP then introduced a bill in the Reichstag that would authorize the states to find a solution without recourse to the courts. It was the starting point for a political process that led to the failed referendum on princely expropriation at the Reich level in 1926.

The Braun government subsequently intensified negotiations with the Hohenzollerns over the former royal house's assets. In the end a compromise was reached that the SPD viewed very critically. The main Hohenzollern line received 250,000 acres of land and 15 million Reichsmarks. The Prussian state also received 250,000 acres, plus the royal palaces along with the Bellevue and Babelsberg palaces, works of art, the coronation regalia, the library of the former royal house, the archives and the theater. In Parliament, KPD deputies reacted with anger and even violence. The vote went in favor of the agreement. It is noteworthy that not only the Communists rejected the bill, but also that the representatives of the governing SPD party either voted against it or did not participate in the vote. Braun was only able to ensure that more SPD deputies did not vote against the bill by threatening to resign.

Tensions with the Reich government 

On 6 October 1926, as had been agreed with Braun some time earlier, Carl Severing resigned as Minister of the Interior, leaving the Minister President the only political heavyweight in the cabinet. Severing was succeeded by Albert Grzesinski (SPD).

There were frequent tensions between the Christian-bourgeois Reich governments and the center-left government in Prussia. One practical issue was revenue sharing between the Reich and the states. Compensation for the financial harm caused by territorial losses under the terms of the Treaty of Versailles remained a central point of conflict between the Reich and Prussia. The disputes over the use of flags on Constitution Day in 1927 fell into the realm of symbolic politics, which was important for the citizens' idea of the state. Braun announced a boycott of those hotels in Berlin that flew the old imperial black-white-red colors instead of the Republic's black-red-gold. When he asked the Reich government to join in the boycott call, Reich Minister of the Interior Walter von Keudell (DNVP) protested against Prussia's "insolence". The conflict was exacerbated when Prussian Minister of Culture Becker restricted the rights of student self-government at Prussian universities because of the increasing influence of the völkisch movement there. When nationally minded student bodies protested against the move, Keudell openly backed them. Not least because of these and other conflicts with the Reich Minister of the Interior, Braun became an important integration figure among Social Democrats.

Agricultural policy 
A relic of the feudal past in Prussia was the manorial district. Those living on them had no communal right of residence and were subject to the police power invested in the landlords. Using groundwork laid by Interior Minister Grzesinski, the Braun government abolished the districts in 1927. The change affected 12,000 manorial districts with a combined population of 1.5 million. Some remnants of the old conditions did however continue to exist east of the Elbe River (East Elbia). There were many agricultural workers who received part of their wages in kind, such as free housing, food or land use. As late as 1928, 83% of the income of an average farm worker in East Prussia consisted of such wages, although the figure was somewhat lower in Silesia and Pomerania. Employers preferred this form of pay because it tied workers more closely to them and made it difficult to verify the accuracy of their wages.

The situation was different in areas with a population made up predominantly of independent farmers. Even so, reservations about politics in rural regions remained strong, as is shown by the emergence of rural protest parties such as the Christian-National Peasants' and Farmers' Party. In Schleswig-Holstein, which was characterized not by large landholdings but by farmers, an agrarian protest movement developed toward the end of the 1920s with the Rural People's Movement.

Educational policy 
The period of the grand coalition saw the beginning of a reform of the educational system that was initially pushed forward by the independent Minister of Education Carl Heinrich Becker. One of its goals was to reduce the educational disparity between urban and rural areas.

According to the Reich constitution, the training of elementary school teachers was to be aligned with that of the higher schools. How that was to be done was left a matter for the states. Some, such as Thuringia and Saxony, introduced teacher training at universities or technical universities. Others, including Bavaria and Württemberg, retained the old seminar method. In 1924 Prussia introduced a middle course using denominational pedagogic academies with a shorter training period than in a regular university course.

Prussia increased its funding for additional educational opportunities aimed in particular at gifted blue- and white-collar workers. In 1928 there were 102  – schools with the goal of bringing gifted elementary school students up to high school readiness level – with 13,000 students. In 1928 a broad majority decided to introduce educational grants of 20,000 Reichsmarks to support the less well-off. Just one year later, the sum had reached 100,000 Reichsmarks, although additional increases were slowed by fiscal considerations, including on the part of the SPD.

In other areas, problems of long standing were addressed, such as reducing the pupil-teacher ratio from 55 in 1911 to 38 in 1928. Overall, however, personnel costs in education, which placed a heavy burden on the state budget, led to the SPD at times limiting educational expenditures in opposition to its stated goals.

State Parliament election 1928 

In May 1928 elections were held at both the Reich and state levels. In the Prussian state elections, the SPD made gains while the Centre and DDP both lost seats. In spite of that, the coalition had a parliamentary majority, with a combined 228 of 450 seats. The government remained the same, and Braun promised continued work. One of the government's projects was to be a municipal reorganization of the Ruhr region.

Religious politics 
As the election campaign of 1918/19 had shown, the memory of royal Prussia's Kulturkampf ('cultural conflict') against the Catholic Church was still alive, but in large part due to the strong position of the Centre Party in Parliament and the government, the Catholic population had come to identify relatively strongly with the new Free State of Prussia. Its high point and symbol was the Prussian Concordat with the Vatican, signed on 14 June 1929 by Eugenio Pacelli (later Pope Pius XII). The treaty superseded an 1821 agreement between the Kingdom of Prussia and the Vatican and eliminated the last remnants of church legislation from the  period. It regulated state contributions to the church and the arrangement of bishoprics, including reestablishing the bishoprics of Aachen and Berlin. School issues were excluded, but it regulated the academic training of clergy. The forms of episcopal elections and similar issues were also clarified.

There was opposition to the concordat from various sides. The Lutheran Church, supported by the DNVP and DVP, saw it as strengthening Catholicism. Freethinkers in the SPD also rejected the agreement.

While the Catholic population was successfully won over to the new Prussia, the issue was more difficult when it came to Protestants. With the revolution, the Protestants of the Prussian Union of Churches lost the king as their top leader. He had officially been the head bishop (summus episcopus) of the Union with far-reaching rights, even to the shaping of the liturgy. Emperor William II had taken the task very seriously, and after the revolution many Protestants lacked an important figure by which to orient themselves. A considerable percentage of church-going Protestants voted for the anti-democratic and nationalistic DNVP. It was no coincidence that the motto of the Protestant church congress of 1927 was "". Antisemitic influences, especially among theological faculties, also grew in strength.

An ecclesiastical treaty with the Protestant regional churches in Prussia did not come about until 1931. On the state's side, it was promoted by Adolf Grimme (SPD), who had become Minister of Culture. A "political clause" that regulated the state's objections to the filling of high church positions, similar to the concordat with the Catholic Church, met with resistance from the church.

Prussia and the crisis of the Republic

Blood May 1929 
Using sometimes drastic measures, the Prussian government tried to oppose the increasing radicalization from both the left and the right. In December 1928, following political clashes between Communists, National Socialists and Social Democrats in Berlin, the city's police chief Karl Zörgiebel issued a ban on all open-air demonstrations and gatherings. The ban applied to 1 May 1929, International Workers' Day. The KPD ignored the ban and called for a mass demonstration. Fighting resembling a civil war broke out between police and Communist supporters. Zörgiebel had ordered a crackdown and, with the SPD's approval, was determined to set an example. The fighting – which came to be known as "Blood May" – cost 33 lives, and nearly 200 people were injured. More than 1,200 arrests were made. The assumption that the KPD had planned a violent overthrow of the government could not be proven. Only later did telegrams intercepted from Moscow seem to suggest this. The Prussian government pressed for a ban of the KPD and all its subsidiary organizations. Carl Severing, who at the time was Reich Minister of the Interior, rejected the idea as unwise and impracticable. Prussia then banned the Alliance of Red Front Fighters. With the exception of Brunswick, the other German states did the same.

The events led to increased hostility in the KPD towards the Social Democrats. Ernst Thälmann, leader of the KPD, called the "social fascism" of the SPD a particularly dangerous form of fascism. He urged the KPD to direct its policies against the SPD as the "main enemy".

Bulwark of democracy 
Even after the formation of Heinrich Brüning's (Centre Party) Reich government on 31 March 1930 and the Reichstag election of 14 September 1930, which marked the NSDAP's parliamentary breakthrough, Prussia's government continued to work for democracy and the Republic. The ban on uniforms for the NSDAP was not lifted, nor was the provision that civil servants could not belong to the anti-constitutional KPD or NSDAP. In a sign of the crisis, Severing returned as Minister of the Interior in October 1930. He named his predecessor Albert Grzesinski as Berlin's chief of police. Braun, Severing and chairman of the SPD parliamentary group Ernst Heilmann supported the SPD's course of tolerating Brüning due to the lack of political alternatives.

The National Socialists saw Prussia as an important strategic target in taking over power in Germany. Joseph Goebbels wrote in 1930, "The key to power in Germany lies in Prussia. Whoever has Prussia also has the Reich." Others on the right saw the situation similarly. Unlike during the Reich government of Hermann Müller (28 June 1928 – 27 March 1930), Brüning temporarily blocked cooperation with Prussia against the NSDAP. In December 1931 the Reich government prevented the execution of an arrest warrant against Adolf Hitler issued by Berlin police chief Grzesinski. The Prussian government then presented the Reich government with an extensive dossier proving the anti-constitutional activities of the NSDAP and announced a ban on the Sturmabteilung (SA) in Prussia. Only after such pressure did Brüning also support the ban of all paramilitary units of the NSDAP at the Reich level.

Referendum on the dissolution of the state Parliament 
In 1929 the Braun government banned the paramilitary Stahlhelm in the Rhineland and Westphalia for violating the demilitarization provisions of the Treaty of Versailles. In 1930, when the Young Plan on German reparations came into force and foreign troops were to evacuate the Rhineland, Reich President Paul von Hindenburg, who was an honorary member of the Stahlhelm, forced the ban to be lifted by threatening not to take part in the celebrations in Koblenz to mark the evacuation.

At the end of May 1931, Stahlhelm leader Franz Seldte sharply attacked the "Marxist" Prussian government at the Reich Front-Line Soldiers' Day in Breslau. He announced a plan to call a referendum for the premature dissolution of the Prussian Parliament. The Stahlhelm's move was supported by the DVP, DNVP and NSDAP, and 5.96 million Prussians signed the initiative to put the referendum on the ballot. This was slightly more than the necessary 20% of eligible voters, and the referendum was held on 8 August 1931. Under pressure from Joseph Stalin and the Comintern, which at the time considered the fight against the "social-fascist" SPD more important than resistance to the extreme right, the KPD also supported the referendum. Especially because many Communist voters did not follow the party's lead, the referendum failed with only 37.1% of the votes in favor of an early dissolution.

State Parliament election 1932 

Elections in Prussia and several other states were scheduled to be held after the Reich presidential election of 1932 in which Hindenburg, supported by the German State Party (formerly the DDP), the Centre and the SPD, prevailed over Hitler and Thälmann (KPD). Since Prussia's coalition parties had to assume that the democratic camp would fare badly in view of the political radicalization, the rules of procedure were changed at the instigation of Ernst Heilmann, chairman of the SPD parliamentary group. A preliminary form of a constructive vote of no confidence was introduced to prevent the Minister President from being voted out of office by a purely negative majority – one formed by two parties unwilling to work with one another. From then on, an absolute majority was required for the election of the Minister President.

The coalition parties' fears about the 1932 Prussian election were justified. The SPD dropped to 21.2%. The German State Party shrank almost to insignificance with 1.5%. In contrast, the NSDAP grew from 1.8% to 36.7% and became the strongest parliamentary group with 162 seats. The coalition had lost its majority. Together the parties had only 163 seats. With 219 seats, the KPD and NSDAP had a negative majority. The National Socialist Hanns Kerrl became president of the Prussian Parliament.

The government then resigned but remained in office on a caretaker basis until a new Minister President could be elected. Similar situations existed in other states of the Reich.

The attempt to form a new majority government proved unsuccessful. There were negotiations between the Centre and the NSDAP, but the configuration, which Severing and Braun considered to be a possibility, failed. Nor could a majority be found to again revise the amended rules of procedure. It thus seemed possible that the caretaker government could continue on indefinitely. Ernst Heilmann in particular tried to convince the KPD to tolerate it. Since the KPD had weakened its stance against social fascism in favor of a united front, the attempt had at least some chance at success, but in the end it too failed.

Braun had had a physical collapse on the night of 22–23 April in the wake of the exertions of the election campaign. When it became clear that his caretaker government would remain in office, he handed over the day-to-day affairs to his deputy Heinrich Hirtsiefer of the Centre Party.

1932 Prussian coup d'état 

Behind the scenes, the cabinet of Reich Chancellor Franz von Papen exerted pressure for the quick election of a new Minister President based on cooperation between the NSDAP and the Centre. Coalition negotiations did take place, but the Centre was unwilling to elect a National Socialist Minister President. On 11 June the Reich government threatened for the first time to appoint a Reich commissioner for Prussia. The occasion was the Altona Bloody Sunday of 17 July 1932. In Altona, a town in Prussia adjacent to Hamburg, there were violent clashes between supporters of the KPD, the NSDAP and members of the police that left 18 dead. It prompted the use on 20 July 1932 of an emergency decree, already prepared but not yet dated, entitled "Restoration of Public Safety and Order in the State of Prussia". The members of the executive Prussian State Ministry were relieved of their posts, von Papen was appointed Reich Commissioner for Prussia, and Franz Bracht of the Centre Party became his deputy. When von Papen asked Severing whether he was prepared to voluntarily vacate his post, he replied, "According to my understanding of the actions of the Reich government, I cannot think of voluntarily leaving my office. I will therefore yield only to force."

A state of emergency was declared in Berlin and the province of Brandenburg. The police were placed under the command of General Gerd von Rundstedt, and high-ranking leaders of the police were arrested. There was no active resistance, such as a general strike by the SPD and trade unions. The Reichsbanner Schwarz-Rot-Gold – a paramilitary force connected primarily to the SPD – was also not mobilized.

Von Papen and Bracht then began removing leading civil servants and other executives who were close to the parties of the Braun government and replacing them for the most part with conservative officials.

On the day of the Prussian coup d'état, the caretaker government filed suit with the Reich Constitutional Court in Leipzig. Hermann Heller represented the SPD parliamentary group and Carl Schmitt the Reich government. On 25 October 1932 the court determined that the removal of the Prussian government had been illegal. The caretaker government was given the right to represent Prussia before the state's Parliament, the Council of State, the Reichsrat and the other states. The judges also ruled that a "temporary" appointment of Reich commissioners was constitutional. As a result, Prussia effectively had two governments: the Braun government, which had no access to the administrative apparatus, and the Reich commissioner's office that controlled the government resources that wielded power.

After the de facto dismissal of the Braun government, Joseph Goebbels summed up the situation in his diary: "The Reds have been eliminated. Their organizations offer no resistance. ... The Reds have had their great hour. They will never come again."

National Socialist era (1933–1945) 

After the installation of Hitler's government on 30 January 1933, Hermann Göring became Reich Commissioner of the Interior for Prussia. In a departure from the previous arrangement, the office of Reich Commissioner itself was assumed not by the Reich Chancellor (Hitler) but by the Vice Chancellor, Franz von Papen. The replacement of politically undesirable officials was pushed forward more aggressively. The Prussian police force, subordinate to Göring, was an important element in enforcing National Socialist rule. The Gestapo grew out of the Prussian political police.

To clear the way for the dissolution of the Prussian Parliament, Minister President Braun was removed from office by emergency decree on 6 February. In accordance with the constitution, a three-member body consisting of von Papen, parliamentary president Hanns Kerrl and the chairman of the Council of State Konrad Adenauer were to decide whether to dissolve Parliament. Adenauer opposed the move and left the negotiations. The two remaining members then decided on its dissolution.

The Reichstag fire on 27 February 1933 led not only to the suspension of numerous fundamental rights and an intensification of the persecution of political opponents but also to a wide-ranging abolition of the powers of state governments.

The new Reich government pushed to end Braun's caretaker government. In the elections for the Prussian Parliament on 5 March, the NSDAP won the most votes at 43.2%. Although it did not achieve a majority, it made significant gains even in Catholic regions. Since the National Socialists, despite gains, did not have a majority in many cities even after the municipal elections of 12 March 1933, the takeover of power was achieved through political manipulation. The Prussian Municipal Constitution Act of 15 December 1933 replaced elected municipal parliaments with appointed municipal councils.

On 22 March 1933, the new Prussian Parliament was constituted. As in the Reich, the mandates of the Communist deputies were revoked and many of them arrested. As a result, the NSDAP had an absolute majority. The Parliament confirmed the dismissal of the Braun government, which officially resigned. The Parliament refrained from electing a new Minister President. The Provisional Law and Second Law on the Coordination of the States with the Reich of 31 March and 7 April 1933 subordinated Prussia to the Reich. On 11 April Hitler appointed Göring Prussian Minister President, and the state Parliament met for the last time on 18 May 1933. It approved an enabling act that transferred legislative power to the Reich Ministry of State. The SPD alone refused to go along. The act meant the final end of a democratic system in Prussia.

Under the Nazi regime, the structures of the states were increasingly eroded. The "First Ordinance for the Unification and Simplification of Administration" of 19 July 1934 effectively merged state ministries with Reich ministries. In the "Law on the Reconstruction of the Reich" of 30 January 1934 and the "Reich Governors Law" of 30 January 1935, the states and the provinces of Prussia were dissolved in fact if not in law. The state landtage were abolished and state governments were controlled by Reichsstatthaltern (Reich Governors) who were appointed by the Chancellor. The law designated Hitler himself as the Reich Governor of Prussia, although he delegated these functions to Göring. By the "Law on the Abolition of the Reichsrat" of 14 February 1934, the states lost their representation to the upper chamber of the German parliament.

The new rulers were quite successful in appealing to Prussian traditions of discipline and devotion to the state. They were able to connect with trends of the 1920s from the right wing of the political spectrum in which the Prussia of Frederick the Great and Otto von Bismarck and their "Prussian socialism" were compared favorably to liberalism and social democracy. Prussian administrative efficiency was misused for coercive and terrorist rule. In the Prussian-influenced officer corps, few invoked Prussia to refuse serving Hitler.

A few changes were made to Prussian provinces under the Nazi regime. The Greater Hamburg Act of 1937 transferred some territory from the provinces of Hanover and Schleswig-Holstein to Hamburg while at the same time annexing Geesthacht (part of Hamburg) and Lübeck to Schleswig-Holstein, as well as Cuxhaven (Hamburg) to the Province of Hanover. Other changes took place in 1939 involving cessions of suburban municipalities of Hanover to Bremen and in return the annexation of Bremerhaven to the Province of Hanover. Wilhelmshaven (Hanover) was ceded to Oldenburg.

The Prussian lands transferred to Poland after the Treaty of Versailles were reannexed during World War II. Most of the territory was not reintegrated into Prussia but assigned to separate territories of Nazi Germany.

Formal dissolution (1945–1947) 

At the end of World War II in 1945, Germany was divided into Zones of Occupation, and all of Germany east of the Oder–Neisse line was ceded to other countries. As had been the case after World War I, almost all of the territory had been Prussian, although a small portion east of the new border had belonged to Saxony. Most of the land went to Poland, ostensibly as compensation for the seizure of Poland's eastern territories by the Soviet Union. The northern third of East Prussia including Königsberg (renamed Kaliningrad in 1946) was annexed by the Soviets. The losses represented nearly two-fifths of Prussian territory and nearly a quarter of the territory within Germany's pre-1938 borders. An estimated ten million Germans fled or were forcibly expelled from the territories.

What remained of Prussia comprised both a little over half of the remaining German territory and a little over half of Prussia's pre-1914 territory. Control Council Law No. 46 of 25 February 1947 explicitly decreed that Prussia should be dissolved. The Allies cited Prussia's history of militarism as a reason for dissolving it. Its reconstitution was also opposed (if not for the same reasons) by powerful German postwar politicians, especially the first West German Chancellor Konrad Adenauer.

Moreover, growing tensions between the Western Allies and the Soviet Union eventually resulted in the Prussian territories west of the Oder-Neisse line being further divided by what became known as the inner German border. The lands east of this boundary (except West Berlin) became part of the German Democratic Republic and the remainder became part of the Federal Republic of Germany. This effectively would have made it impossible to reconstitute a Prussian state resembling the one that existed prior to the Nazi era, even if there had been any significant political will to do so.

Post-war dismemberment

After the Allied occupation of Germany in 1945, the provinces of Prussia were split up into the following territories/German states:
 Ceded to the Soviet Union The northern third of East Prussia. Today the Kaliningrad Oblast is a Russian exclave between Lithuania and Poland.
 Ceded to Poland Everything east of the Oder–Neisse line plus Stettin. This included most of Silesia, Eastern Pomerania, the Neumark region of Brandenburg, all of Posen-West Prussia, and the portion of East Prussia not ceded to Russia.
 Placed under Soviet administration The following states, after merging with other German states, were formed after the war, then abolished in 1952 and finally recreated following the reunification of Germany in 1990:
Brandenburg, from the remainder of the Province of Brandenburg.
Saxony-Anhalt, from the bulk of the Province of Saxony. The remainder of the province became part of Thuringia.
Mecklenburg-Vorpommern: the remainder of the Province of Pomerania (most of Western Pomerania) merged into Mecklenburg.
Saxony: the remainder of the Province of Silesia merged into Saxony.
 Placed under Allied administration The remainder of Prussia was merged with other German states to become the following states of West Germany:
Schleswig-Holstein, from the province of Schleswig-Holstein (under British administration).
Lower Saxony, from the province of Hanover (under British administration).
North Rhine-Westphalia, from the province of Westphalia and the northern half of the Rhine Province (under British administration).
Rhineland-Palatinate, from the southern part of the Rhine Province (under French administration).
Hesse, from the province of Hesse-Nassau (under American administration).
Württemberg-Hohenzollern, from the southern half of the former state of Württemberg and the province of Hohenzollern (under French administration). The state was ultimately merged with Baden and Württemberg-Baden to form Baden-Württemberg.
 Berlin Divided into East Berlin under Soviet administration and West Berlin under Allied sectors of administration (British, French and American). West Berlin was surrounded by East Germany and ultimately was enclosed by the Berlin Wall. The two halves were reunited after German reunification to form the modern German state of Berlin. A proposal to merge Berlin with the reformed state of Brandenburg was rejected by popular vote in 1996.

References

Prussia
 
1910s in Prussia
1920s in Prussia
1930s in Prussia
West Prussia
1918 establishments in Germany
1947 disestablishments in Germany
1918 establishments in Prussia
1947 disestablishments in Prussia
States and territories established in 1918
States and territories disestablished in 1947